Ernesto Juárez (born 16 December 1934) is an Argentine footballer. He played in eleven matches for the Argentina national football team in 1962 and 1963. He was also part of Argentina's squad for the 1963 South American Championship.

References

External links
 
 

1934 births
Living people
Argentine footballers
Argentina international footballers
Place of birth missing (living people)
Association football forwards
Ferro Carril Oeste footballers
Club Atlético Huracán footballers
Club Atlético River Plate footballers
Rosario Central footballers
Club Guaraní players
Club Libertad footballers
Argentine expatriate footballers
Expatriate footballers in Paraguay